Night Presence II is an outdoor 1976 welded Cor-Ten steel sculpture by Louise Nevelson, installed at the San Diego Museum of Art's May S. Marcy Sculpture Garden, in the U.S. state of California.

See also

 1976 in art

References

External links
 

1976 sculptures
Outdoor sculptures in San Diego
Sculptures of the San Diego Museum of Art
Steel sculptures in California